Events in the year 1774 in India.

Events
National income - ₹9,670 million
 Warren Hastings, governor of Bengal, appointed the first Governor-General.
 Rampur Raza Library was established in India now the part of Uttar Pradesh.

References

 
India
Years of the 18th century in India